The 2013 Pan American Fencing Championships were held in Cartagena, Colombia from 16 June to 21 June.

Medal summary

Men's events

Women's events

Medal table

References

2013
Pan American Fencing Championships
International fencing competitions hosted by Colombia
2013 in Colombian sport